Feel Something is the second studio album by British band The History of Apple Pie. It was released on 30 September 2014 under Marshall Teller Records.

Critical reception
Feel Something was met with generally favourable reviews from critics. At Metacritic, which assigns a weighted average rating out of 100 to reviews from mainstream publications, this release received an average score of 68, based on 10 reviews.

Track listing

References

2014 albums
The History of Apple Pie albums